The Scott Paper Company was the world's largest manufacturer and marketer of sanitary tissue products with operations in 22 countries. Its products were sold under a variety of well-known brand names, including Scott Tissue, Cottonelle, Baby Fresh, Scottex and Viva. Consolidated sales of its consumer and commercial products totalled approximately $3.6 billion in 1994.

The company was acquired by the Kimberly-Clark Corporation in 1995.

History

Scott Paper was founded in 1879 in Philadelphia by brothers E. Irvin and Clarence Scott, and is often credited as being the first to market toilet paper sold on a roll.  They began marketing paper towels in 1907, and paper tissues in the 1930s.

In 1927, Scott purchased a Nova Scotian pulp mill, and thus began a long series of acquisitions. It joined with The Mead Corporation in 1936 to form Brunswick Pulp & Paper Company, which used their pulp mill in Georgia to supply both Mead and Scott. The company then bought mills in New York and Wisconsin, and during the 1950s Scott merged with Soundview Pulp Company and Hollingsworth & Whitney Company, which provided timberlands and mills in Washington, Alabama, and Maine.

Scott enjoyed success throughout the 20th century due to their advertising methods, which can be traced back to Arthur Scott, the son of E. Irvin Scott. Scott's hard-sell magazine advertisements of the 1930s focused on warnings that using harsh toilet paper would lead to painful rectal trouble.

In December 1994, Scott sold its printing and publishing papers business, consisting of its wholly owned subsidiary, S.D. Warren, for approximately $1.6 billion.

Acquisition by Kimberly-Clark
In 1995, Scott Paper was acquired by Kimberly-Clark, which continues to use the Scott brand. Scott Paper Limited, its subsidiary in Canada, was sold and became Kruger Inc.  As part of the sale of the company, the Baby Fresh baby wipes brand was sold to Procter & Gamble and is now sold under the Pampers brand.
The Scotties facial tissue brand in the United States was sold to Irving Tissue. Other divested brands include Cut-Rite, a brand of waxed paper, which was sold to Reynolds Metals in 1986.

Headquarters

The headquarters of the company for many years was located at International Plaza (known then as Scott Plaza) in Tinicum Township, Delaware County, Pennsylvania, in Greater Philadelphia. The complex at that time consisted of three buildings known as Plaza I, Plaza II, and Plaza III. Plaza I was completed in 1961. Plaza II was completed after 1961. Plaza III was completed in 1969. The complex was constructed for the purpose of serving as Scott's headquarters.

See also

 Albert J. Dunlap
 Kleenex
 Kimberly-Clark

References

External links
 Kimberly Clark's Scott Products website

Manufacturing companies based in Pennsylvania
Pulp and paper companies of the United States
Companies based in Delaware County, Pennsylvania
Defunct companies based in Pennsylvania
Kimberly-Clark brands
Manufacturing companies established in 1879
Manufacturing companies disestablished in 1995
1879 establishments in Pennsylvania
1995 mergers and acquisitions